Joanna of Hainault (1315–1374) was a Duchess of Jülich by marriage to William V, Duke of Jülich. She was the third daughter of William I, Count of Hainaut, and Joan of Valois. She was a younger sister of Philippa of Hainault, Queen of England, and Margaret II, Countess of Hainault.

Life 
Joanna married William V, Duke of Jülich, their children were as follows:

Gerhard VI of Jülich, Count of Berg and Ravensberg, grandfather of Adolph I, Duke of Cleves
William II, Duke of Jülich
Richardis of Jülich, married Count Engelbert III of the Mark
Philippa of Jülich, married Godfrey II of Heinsberg
Reinold
Joanna of Jülich, married William I, Count of Isenburg-Wied
Isabella of Jülich, married John Plantagenet, 3rd Earl of Kent

Ancestry

1315 births
1374 deaths
Avesnes family
14th-century French people 
14th-century French women